The 2014 Asian Men's Club Volleyball Championship also known as the PLDT HOME Fibr 2014 Asian Men's Club Volleyball Championship due to sponsorship reasons was the 15th staging of the AVC Club Championships. The tournament was supposed to be held in Vietnam but later withdrew from hosting. The tournament was instead held in Pasay, Philippines from 8 to 16 April 2014. The champions qualified for the 2014 and 2015 Club World Championship as Asia's representative.

Venues
 Mall of Asia Arena, Pasay, Philippines – Pool A, B and Final Round
 Cuneta Astrodome, Pasay, Philippines – Pool C, D and Classification 9th–16th

Pools composition
The teams are seeded based on their final ranking at the 2013 Asian Men's Club Volleyball Championship. The draw took place on February 14 at the Grand Ballroom of the New World Hotel in Makati.

* Withdrew

Preliminary round

Pool A

|}

|}

Pool B

|}

|}

Pool C

|}

|}

Pool D

|}

|}

Classification 9th–16th

Quarterfinals

|}

13th–16th semifinals

|}

9th–12th semifinals

|}

15th place

|}

13th place

|}

11th place

|}

9th place

|}

Final round

Quarterfinals

|}

5th–8th semifinals

|}

Semifinals

|}

7th place

|}

5th place

|}

3rd place

|}

Final

|}

Final standing

Awards
MVP:  Shahram Mahmoudi (Matin)
Best Setter:  Li Runming (Beijing)
Best Outside Spikers:  Maxim Samarin (Kondensat) and  Cristian Savani (Al-Rayyan)
Best Middle Blockers:  Mohammad Mousavi (Matin) and  Mostafa Sharifat (Matin)
Best Opposite Spiker:  Vitaliy Vorivodin (Kondensat)
Best Libero:  Sulaiman Saeed (Al-Rayyan)

References

External links
Asian Volleyball Confederation

Asian Men's Club Volleyball Championship
Asian Men's Club Volleyball Championship
Asian Men's Club Volleyball Championship
International volleyball competitions hosted by the Philippines